The 2000 Great Yarmouth Borough Council election took place on 4 May 2000 to elect members of Great Yarmouth Borough Council in Norfolk, England. One third of the council was up for election and the Conservative Party gained overall control of the council from the Labour Party.

After the election, the composition of the council was:
Conservative 26
Labour 22

Election result

References

2000 English local elections
2000
2000s in Norfolk